Moments from the Fringe is a Saigon Kick demo compilation put together by vocalist/guitarist Jason Bieler.

The album includes "Dizzy's Vine", the last track recorded by the reunited original line-up of the band in June 1997.

Track listing 

 "Dizzy's Vine" - 5:16
 "Colors" - 3:38
 "Hey Hey Hey" - 3:32
 "Homeland" - 2:41
 "Beautiful" - 2:42
 "My Only Friend" - 2:16
 "Love Is on the Way" - 2:17
 "Spidee the Rapist" - 4:22
 "God of 42nd Street" - 1:25
 "Feel the Same Way" - 2:06
 "When You Were Mine" - 4:01
 "Hostile Youth" - 3:33
 "All I Want" - 3:56
 "Spot Him a Beer" - 3:17
 "You and I" - 4:13
 "My Heart Screams" - 2:03
 "Salvation" - 2:57
 "The Lizard" - 4:04

External links 

Saigon Kick albums
1998 compilation albums
Demo albums